Madureira may refer to:

Madureira, Rio de Janeiro, a neighborhood of Rio de Janeiro, Brazil
Madureira Esporte Clube, a Brazilian football team
Madureira (surname)